The Flintstone Primetime Specials (onscreen title: The Flintstone Special) is a four-episode limited-run prime time television revival of The Flintstones produced by Hanna-Barbera Productions which aired on NBC from September 26, 1980 to October 11, 1981.

List of animated specials

Voice cast
 Henry Corden - Fred Flintstone
 Mel Blanc - Barney Rubble, Dino
 Jean Vander Pyl - Wilma Flintstone, Pebbles Flintstone
 Gay Autterson - Betty Rubble
 Don Messick - Bamm-Bamm Rubble
 John Stephenson - Frank Frankenstone, Mr. Slate
 Pat Parris - Oblivia Frankenstone
 Jim MacGeorge - Stubby Frankenstone
 Julie McWhirter - Hidea Frankenstone

Production
The Flintstones' New Neighbors and Jogging Fever were animated at Filman, an animation studio in Madrid, Spain (headed by Carlos Alfonso and Juan Pina) who did a lot of animation work for Hanna-Barbera between the early 1970s through the mid-1980s. Among their credits were such series as Yogi's Space Race, Buford and the Galloping Ghost, The Little Rascals, Paw Paws, The Smurfs and The Jetsons (1980s revival) as well as the specials The Harlem Globetrotters Meet Snow White and Yogi's First Christmas. This would explain why, artistically, the backgrounds in some of these specials look very much like pencil and charcoal drawings, very different from the original series and its spin-offs.

All specials utilized an inferior laugh track created by the studio, the last production to do so.

Home media
On October 9, 2012, Warner Archive released all four specials on DVD in region 1 as part of their Hanna-Barbera Classics Collection in a release entitled The Flintstones Prime-Time Specials Collection: Volume 2.

References

External links
 

1980 American television series debuts
1981 American television series endings
1980s American television specials
 
Hanna-Barbera television specials